Kenny Barron & the Brazilian Knights is an album by pianist Kenny Barron recorded in Rio de Janeiro in 2012 and released on the Sunnyside label.

Reception 

In the review on Allmusic, Matt Collar said "This is highly engaging Brazilian jazz". On PopMatters Brent Faulkner wrote "Kenny Barron & The Brazilian Knights is a superb Brazilian jazz album. It not only highlights Kenny Barron's prodigious pianistic skills, but provides much deserved recognition to relatively unknown Brazilian musicians". In JazzTimes  Michael J. West observed "Brazilian Knights is a high-quality recording from a musician whose high quality is inevitable".

Track listing 
All compositions by Kenny Barron except where noted.

 "Rapaz de Bem" (Johnny Alf) – 5:59
 "Já Era" (Maurício Einhorn) – 4:44
 "Ilusão à Toa" (Alf) – 7:07
 "Só Por Amor" (Baden Powell) – 11:10
 "Curta Metragem" (Einhorn) – 5:03
 "Nós" (Alf) – 6:54
 "Triste" (Antônio Carlos Jobim) – 5:29
 "Sonia Braga" - 7:12
 "Tristeza de Nós Dois" (Einhorn) – 7:56
 "Chorinho Carioca" (Alberto Chimelli) – 4:11
 "São Conrado" (Einhorn) – 7:06
 "Phantoms – 8:43 Bonus track on deluxe edition and iTunes
 "É Só Amar" (Alf) – 7:46 Bonus track on deluxe edition and iTunes
 "É Só Amar" [alternate take]  (Alf) – 7:46 Bonus track on deluxe edition and iTunes
 "Nós" [alternate take] (Alf) – 6:54 Bonus track on deluxe edition and iTunes
 "Ilusão à Toa" [alternate take] (Alf) – 7:08 Bonus track on deluxe edition and iTunes
 "São Conrado" [alternate take] (Einhorn) – 7:06 Bonus track on deluxe edition and iTunes

Personnel 
Kenny Barron – piano
Maurício Einhorn – harmonica
Idriss Boudrioua – alto saxophone
Claudio Roditi – trumpet, flugelhorn
Lula Galvão – guitar
Alberto Chimelli – synthesizer
Sérgio Barrozo – bass
Rafael Barata – drums

References 

Kenny Barron albums
2013 albums
Sunnyside Records albums